S.G.Sethuraman  (June 1924 – November 2019) was a famous weightlifter of India.

References 

1924 births
2015 deaths
Indian male weightlifters
Weightlifters at the 1951 Asian Games
People from Mayiladuthurai district
Weightlifters from Tamil Nadu
Date of death missing
Asian Games competitors for India